Alex Sandro Rossi (born 22 April 1968) is a Brazilian former professional footballer who played as a forward. He first appeared in the top level league with Sport Club Internacional.

In 1992 Rossi moved to Cerro Porteño and, a year later, played in Argentina for Rosario Central and Banfield. In 1995, he went to Universitario but was in bad physical condition so he spent time on the bench. By the end of Descentralizado 1995 he recovered and help with many goals to get Universitario into 1996 Copa Libertadores. Since then, he played in Osasuna (Spain), and in Brazil again.

External links 
 
 
 ficha tecnica.

Living people
1968 births
Brazilian footballers
Association football forwards
Sport Club Internacional players
Cerro Porteño players
Rosario Central footballers
Club Atlético Banfield footballers
Club Universitario de Deportes footballers
Sport Club Corinthians Paulista players
CA Osasuna players
Avaí FC players
Associação Desportiva São Caetano players
Ipatinga Futebol Clube players
Associação Atlética Internacional (Limeira) players
Associação Atlética Caldense players
Tupi Football Club players
Brazilian expatriate footballers
Brazilian expatriate sportspeople in Argentina
Expatriate footballers in Argentina
Brazilian expatriate sportspeople in Paraguay
Expatriate footballers in Paraguay
Brazilian expatriate sportspeople in Peru
Expatriate footballers in Peru
Brazilian expatriate sportspeople in Spain
Expatriate footballers in Spain